The Kristiansund Mainland Connection ( or abbreviated Krifast) is a road system consisting of the European route E39 highway and Norwegian National Road 70 that connects Kristiansund Municipality to the neighboring islands of Frei, Bergsøya, and Aspøya and then to the mainland of Norway. The three main structures are the undersea Freifjord Tunnel, the Gjemnessund Bridge, and the Bergsøysund Bridge.

A drive through the tunnel takes about 5 minutes. Because of the relatively steep climb, there are three lanes at each end, but only two at the bottom.

Krifast was authorized by the Norwegian Parliament and construction began in October 1988. The government pledged to finance 39% of the expenses, the rest were to be taken in as toll on road traffic and car ferry fares (on the ferries to be discontinued due to the new tunnel and bridges). As of July 1991, the project employed 427 people, and spent  daily on construction. Four years and NOK 1.1 billion later, in August 1992, Krifast was opened for regular traffic.

See also
Atlantic Ocean Tunnel

References

Roads in Møre og Romsdal
Nordmøre
Buildings and structures in Kristiansund
Gjemnes
Former toll roads in Norway
Bridge–tunnels in Europe
1992 establishments in Norway
European route E39 in Norway
Norwegian National Road 70